Conostylis is a genus of perennial herbs in the Haemodoraceae family, commonly known as cone flowers. All species are endemic to the south west of Western Australia.

Taxonomy
The genus is the most speciose of the Haemodoraceae family, and one of six genera which only occur in the Southwest Australia bioregion; they are closely related to the well known kangaroo paws, species of Anigozanthos and Macropidia.

Conostylis was described by Robert Brown, published in his Prodromus of Australian flora in 1810. No type species was provided by the author. The genus name Conostylis is derived from Ancient Greek terms for 'cone' and 'column, style', a reference to the conical shape of the style's tip.

Description
They have leathery, strap-like leaves which arise from the base of the plant, sometimes from underground rhizomes. Flowers which usually occur in clusters (sometimes singly) on stalks which emerge from the bases of the leaves. Individual flowers have a short stalk with and six tepals which are either cream, yellow, orange or purple. The tepals join to form a short tube at the base with six similar stamens attached at the top of the tube.

Diversity
The described species of Conostylis include:
Conostylis aculeata R.Br. Prickly conostylis
Conostylis albescens Hopper 
Conostylis androstemma F.Muell. Trumpets
Conostylis angustifolia Hopper 
Conostylis argentea (J.W.Green) Hopper
Conostylis aurea Lindl. Golden conostylis
Conostylis bealiana F.Muell.
Conostylis bracteata Lindl. 
Conostylis breviscapa R.Br. 
Conostylis candicans Endl. Grey cottonhead   
Conostylis caricina Lindl. 
Conostylis crassinerva J.W.Green 
Conostylis deplexa J.W.Green 
Conostylis dielsii W.Fitzg.
Conostylis drummondii Benth. Drummond's conostylis 
Conostylis festucacea Endl. 
Conostylis juncea Endl. 
Conostylis laxiflora Benth. 
Conostylis micrantha Hopper Small-flowered conostylis 
Conostylis misera Endl. Grass conostylis
Conostylis neocymosa Hopper 
Conostylis pauciflora Hopper Dawesville conostylis 
Conostylis petrophiloides F.Muell. ex Benth.
Conostylis phathyrantha Diels 
Conostylis prolifera Benth. Mat cottonheads 
Conostylis pusilla Endl. 
Conostylis resinosa Hopper 
Conostylis robusta Diels  
Conostylis seorsiflora F.Muell.  
Conostylis serrulata R.Br.
Conostylis setigera R.Br. Bristly cottonhead
Conostylis setosa Lindl. White cottonhead
Conostylis stylidioides F.Muell.  
Conostylis teretifolia J.W.Green  
Conostylis teretiuscula F.Muell. 
Conostylis vaginata Endl. Sheath conostylis
Conostylis villosa Benth. 
Conostylis wonganensis Hopper Wongan conostylis

References

External links

 
Commelinales of Australia
Angiosperms of Western Australia
Commelinales genera
Taxa named by Robert Brown (botanist, born 1773)
Plants described in 1810
Endemic flora of Southwest Australia